Syntozyga ephippias is a tortrix moth (family Tortricidae), belonging to tribe Eucosmini of subfamily Olethreutinae. The species was first described by Edward Meyrick in 1907. It is found Sri Lanka, India, the Democratic Republic of the Congo, South Africa and Rodrigues.

Larval food plants are Commelina benghalensis (Commelinaceae) and Bambusa species.

References
 Meyrick, 1907. "Descriptions of Indian Micro-Lepidoptera. III". Journal of the Bombay Natural History Society. 17(3):730–754.

Olethreutinae
Moths described in 1907
Moths of Africa